Peter of P. Grossnickel Farm is a historic home and farm complex located at Myersville, Maryland, Frederick County. It consists of a mid-19th-century, Greek Revival farmhouse and 13 related buildings and structures. The house is a -story stone center-passage house on a limestone foundation, with a -story kitchen wing and  walls.  The house was built between 1840 and 1850. Also on the property is an 1881 tenant house with corresponding barn, spring house, and washhouse / privy; an 1884–1897 bank barn; a pre-1830 granary; a 19th-century wood shed; late-19th-century hog pen / chicken house; a pre-1830 beehive oven; a late-19th-century smokehouse; a spring house with a Late Victorian cottage addition; and early-20th-century concrete block milk house; and a log summer kitchen of unknown date. The Grossnickel family was a German American family who were instrumental in the establishment of the Grossnickel Church of the Brethren.

It was listed on the National Register of Historic Places in 1998.

References

External links
, including photo from 1997, at Maryland Historical Trust

Houses on the National Register of Historic Places in Maryland
Houses in Frederick County, Maryland
Houses completed in 1840
German-American culture in Maryland
Greek Revival houses in Maryland
1840 establishments in Maryland
National Register of Historic Places in Frederick County, Maryland